Matthias Wiegand (born 22 April 1954) is a retired East German track cyclist. He had his best achievements in the 4000 m team pursuit. In this discipline he won a silver medal at the 1980 Summer Olympics, as well as two gold medals at the world championships in 1977 and 1978; his team finished in fourth place at the 1976 Summer Olympics.

References

1954 births
Living people
East German male cyclists
Olympic cyclists of East Germany
Cyclists at the 1976 Summer Olympics
Cyclists at the 1980 Summer Olympics
Olympic medalists in cycling
Olympic silver medalists for East Germany
People from Plauen
Cyclists from Saxony
Medalists at the 1980 Summer Olympics
People from Bezirk Karl-Marx-Stadt